Chrysochernes is a genus of pseudoscorpions in the subfamily Chernetinae.

References

External links 
 
 Chrysochernes at insectoid.info

Pseudoscorpion genera
Chernetidae